Kshetrimayum Biren Singh is an Indian politician of Manipur and member of the Janata Dal (United). He was elected as a member of the Manipur Legislative Assembly from Lamlai constituency in Imphal East District from the Indian National Congress in 2017 Manipur Legislative Assembly election.

During the 2020 Manipur vote of confidence, he was one of the eight MLAs who had skipped the assembly proceedings defying the party whip for the trust vote. He resigned from Indian National Congress and later joined Bharatiya Janata Party in presence of Ram Madhav, Baijayant Panda and Chief Minister of Manipur N. Biren Singh.

References

Living people
Manipur MLAs 1995–2000
Manipur MLAs 2000–2002
Manipur MLAs 2017–2022
Manipur politicians
Bharatiya Janata Party politicians from Manipur
Year of birth missing (living people)
Indian National Congress politicians from Manipur
People from Imphal East district